The Men's Volleyball tournament at the 2005 Mediterranean Games was held in Almería, Spain.

Teams

Group A
 
 

Group B

 
 

Group C

 
 

Group C

Squads

Preliminary round

Group A

Friday June 24, 2005

Sunday June 26, 2005

Tuesday June 28, 2005

Group B

Friday June 24, 2005

Sunday June 26, 2005

Tuesday June 28, 2005

Group C

Friday June 24, 2005

Sunday June 26, 2005

Tuesday June 28, 2005

Group D

Friday June 24, 2005

Sunday June 26, 2005

Tuesday June 28, 2005

Final round

Quarter finals
Thursday June 30, 2005

Classification matches
Friday July 1, 2005

Semi finals
Saturday July 2, 2005

Finals
Sunday July 3, 2005 — Classification Match (7th/8th place)

Sunday July 3, 2005 — Classification Match (5th/6th place)

Sunday July 3, 2005 — Classification Match (Bronze-medal match)

Sunday July 3, 2005 — Classification Match (Gold-medal match)

Final ranking

Awards

See also
2005 Men's European Volleyball Championship

Volleyball at the 2005 Mediterranean Games